East Raleigh Street Historic District is a national historic district located at Siler City, Chatham County, North Carolina.  The district encompasses 39 contributing buildings in a predominantly residential section of Siler City. They were built between about 1895 and 1945, and include representative examples of the Queen Anne and Tudor Revival architectural styles.

It was listed on the National Register of Historic Places in 2000.

References

Historic districts on the National Register of Historic Places in North Carolina
Queen Anne architecture in North Carolina
Tudor Revival architecture in North Carolina
Historic districts in Chatham County, North Carolina
National Register of Historic Places in Chatham County, North Carolina